Jagat (Tamil: ஜாகட், slang derived from Malay word jahat, translated as ‘bad’) is a 2015 Malaysian crime drama film. Set in the early 1990s, the story follows a mischievous 12-year-old boy named Appoy and his relationships with his father, Maniam, and his uncles, former drug-addict Bala and local gangster Dorai. The boy faces pressure from his father to focus on school, but he is drawn to his uncle's life of crime.

The background of the film is a critical period in Malaysian Indian history, the coming-of-age story subtly underlines the plight of the Malaysian Indians community who were forsaken by the estate owners and forced to move to the cities, surviving under harsh circumstances.

The film is directed by Shanjhey Kumar Perumal. He has described the film as semi-autobiographical, having lived for two years in squatter areas with his family. It was released on 17 December 2015 in Malaysia.

The film receives positive reviews from critics. It had won the Best Malaysian Film award in the 28th Malaysia Film Festival in 2016, whereas its director Shanjhey Kumar won the award for Best Director. The film also represent Malaysia at Asean Film Fest 2017.

Plot

The plot centres on Appoy, a spirited kid who would rather watch gangster flicks and make prank calls than memorise his multiplication tables. Desperately trying to keep his son on the straight path, Appoy’s hard-working father becomes increasingly abusive, as the boy is inexorably drawn to the criminal lifestyle of his uncle, a henchman for a local gang. How will their story goes?

Cast

Main Cast
 Jibrail Rajhula as Mexico
 Harvind Raj as Appoy
 Kuben Mahadevan as Maniam
 Tinesh Sarathi Krishnan as Chicago
 Senthil Kumaran Muniandy as Bala
 Marup Mustapah as Da Gou

Supporting cast
 Aahmuu Thirunyanam as Mangai
 Saravanan Ramasamy Vishwa as Teacher Ramu
 Pugalenthan as Takkali
 Siranjeevi as Gila
 Perakas Rajaram as Vadivelan

Production 
The film took around 10 years to be completed as the production team faced several financial issues.

Filming
The principal photography for the film was done across 13 different locations in Malaysia.  Some of the locations are Klian Intan Pangkalan Hulu, Baling, Lenggong, Grik, Kuala Sepetang, Bukit Rotan, Sabak Bernam, Jasin, Jerantut and Kuala Lumpur.

Music 

The film score and soundtrack album are composed by Kamal Sabran and the Space Gambus Experiment. 
There is also separate soundtrack done strictly for promotional purposes called 'JAGAT Naan Nalla Paiyen'.

Reception 
The film was released on 17 December 2015 and is considered to be one of the best Tamil language movies to be made in Malaysia. The film managed to gross a moderate collection in box office despite facing intense competition from blockbuster movies like Star Wars: The Force Awakens and Pasanga 2. It was also the first Tamil-language local movie to screen in cinemas for eight weeks running.

The film available for the international audience through Netflix platform starting from April 2019.

Accolades

See also
 Malaysian Tamil cinema

References

External links
 Official website 
 
 Jagat at Cinema Online
 Netflix

Tamil-language Malaysian films
Malaysian crime drama films
2010s Tamil-language films
Tamil diaspora in Malaysia
2015 films
Squatting in film